The 1962 Minnesota lieutenant gubernatorial election took place on November 6, 1962. Minnesota Democratic-Farmer-Labor Party candidate Sandy Keith defeated Republican Party of Minnesota challenger C. Donald Peterson.

Results

External links
 Election Returns

Minnesota
Lieutenant Gubernatorial
1962